The West Eighth Street Historic District  is a national historic district located at Anderson, Madison County, Indiana. This District consists of homes, churches, parks, commercial and public buildings, that were constructed during the last decade of the nineteenth century and first decade of the twentieth century. There are approximately 200 structures in this District in styles that represent cottages of various styles, Queen Anne styles, Free Classic, Colonial Revival styles and a good collection of notable Italianate homes. Most of these homes were constructed during the gas boom in the late 1880s, and were the homes to Anderson's business, civic and governmental leaders.

It was listed in the National Register of Historic Places in 1976.

References

 Anderson: A Pictorial History by Esther Dittlinger, copyright 1991

External links
 City of Anderson Web Site - http://www.cityofanderson.com/historic/west8th.aspx

Historic districts on the National Register of Historic Places in Indiana
Queen Anne architecture in Indiana
Colonial Revival architecture in Indiana
Buildings and structures in Anderson, Indiana
National Register of Historic Places in Madison County, Indiana